Jarl-André Storbæk (born 21 September 1978) is a Norwegian footballer who played as a defender. Between 2005 and 2008, he was capped 17 times for the Norway national team.

Storbæk has previously played for Tippeligaen clubs HamKam and Vålerenga, Panetolikos at the second tier in Greece, and SønderjyskE in the Danish Superliga. His cousin, Håvard Storbæk, is also a footballer and has played for Odd Grenland and FK Haugesund.

Club career
Storbæk was born in Trysil and grew up in Ljørdalen, 50 km outside Trysil. After playing for Østre Trysil during his youth, Storbæk first club was the local Nybergsund. After playing for Raufoss in the First Division from 2000 to 2003, Storbæk joined the Tippeligaen side HamKam ahead of the 2004 season.

Half-way through the 2005 season, Vålerenga was looking for a left back and made a  offer for Storbæk. HamKam, who were struggling against relegation, rejected the offer, and their coach, Ståle Solbakken, stated that  would be a suitable price for Storbæk. Vålerenga instead signed Tommy Stenersen from Stabæk. The two clubs agreed on a transfer for Storbæk after the season, and he signed a four-year deal with Vålerenga on 14 November 2005. Storbæk played a total of 51 matches for HamKam, scoring five goals.

The next season, Storbæk scored the equalizing goal on a penalty kick in the 1–1 draw against his old club HamKam. He played for Vålerenga from 2006 to 2009, and played a total of 99 matches and scored nine goals. Storbæk's contract with Vålerenga ended after the 2009-season, and he didn't want to sign a new deal with the club as he wanted to try playing abroad.

In February 2010, Storbæk signed a short-term contract with the Greek second tier club Panetolikos till the end of the 2009–10 season. Storbæk then joined the Danish club SønderjyskE in June 2010, as a replacement for Sölvi Ottesen who had transferred to F.C. Copenhagen. Storbæk played 68 matches in the Danish Superliga before he moved back to Norway and joined Strømsgodset in August 2012. Strømsgodset's coach Ronny Deila praised Storbæk as a "long-term signing" and believed that the 33-year-old would help Godset both in the race for the 2012 Tippeligaen-title and in the next few seasons.

Storbæk made his debut for Strømsgodset in the 1–1 draw against Sogndal on 2 September 2012. Deila made Storbæk captain in his first match, due to the absence of Alexander Aas and Adam Larsen Kwarasey.

Storbæk returned to former club Nybergsund in January 2015 in a dual role as player and assistant coach, having agreed a three-year contract.

International career
From 2005 to 2008, Storbæk played 17 matches for Norway.

Managerial career
After retiring at the end of 2016, Storbæk became the head coach of the club he just left, Nybergsund IL. The club announced, that they id not wanted to be a player-coach as he wanted, so he retired at this point. He had already been a player-assistant at the club until he retired.

In the 2018 season, Nybergsund was relegated to the 3rd Division and Storbæk got sacked. After the sacking, Storbæk sued the club due to lack of outstanding pay and holiday pay.

Career statistics

Honours
Vålerenga
Norwegian Football Cup: 2008

Strømsgodset
Tippeligaen: 2013

References

External links

1978 births
Living people
People from Trysil
Norwegian footballers
Norway international footballers
Nybergsund IL players
Raufoss IL players
Hamarkameratene players
Vålerenga Fotball players
Panetolikos F.C. players
SønderjyskE Fodbold players
Strømsgodset Toppfotball players
Eliteserien players
Danish Superliga players
Norwegian expatriate footballers
Expatriate footballers in Greece
Norwegian expatriate sportspeople in Greece
Expatriate men's footballers in Denmark
Norwegian expatriate sportspeople in Denmark
Association football defenders
Norwegian football managers
Sportspeople from Innlandet